Stephens Creek is an ephemeral water course in far western New South Wales, Australia. The creek flows around Broken Hill and Silverton, New South Wales, and Stephens Creek Dam, a reservoir on the creek, is Broken Hill's main water supply.

References

Rivers of New South Wales
Broken Hill, New South Wales
Far West (New South Wales)